The next Ontario Liberal Party leadership election will be held following the resignation of Steven Del Duca on June 2, 2022 after the party won only 8 seats and failed again to gain official party status in the general election. The date of the leadership election is to be decided.

Background
In the 2022 general election, the Ontario Liberals saw a modest increase in support over their 2018 result, finishing second in the popular vote. However, the party won only 8 seats, once again falling short of official party status. On the night of the election, Del Duca, who had failed to win back his own riding of Vaughan—Woodbridge, announced his resignation as party leader, stating that a leadership race would be organized to take place "as soon as is reasonable".

Rules and procedures
A constitutional amendment was approved at the March 2023 Annual General Meeting which changed the leadership election process from a delegated leadership convention to a One Member One Vote system weighted by constituency.

Each provincial electoral district will be allocated 100 points, with points in a district allocated in proportion to each candidate by the number of first preference votes received. Each of the party's student clubs will be allocated 50 points, and each of the party's women's clubs will be allocated 5 points. Members will be able to vote online as well as in-person.

This is a change from the previous process in which the leader was chosen in a traditional delegated leadership convention in which up to 2,000+ delegates would be eligible to vote, made up of 1,984 elected delegates (16 elected by proportional representation in each of the 124 provincial riding associations) in addition to ex officio delegates (current and former Liberal MPPs, defeated candidates from the last election, riding association presidents, party executive officers and other party officials, and federal Liberal MPs for Ontario), youth delegates from campus clubs and delegates representing the Women's Commission. Riding delegates would be able to run on the slate of a leadership candidate or as independents; in the case of the former they would be required to vote for that candidate on the first ballot but would be free to change their support subsequently. Balloting at convention would continue until one candidate receives a majority of ballots cast.

At the party's Annual General Meeting in 2019, an organized attempt was made to amend the party constitution to change the leadership election system to eliminate the delegated convention and adopt a weighted One Member One Vote point system similar to the ones used by the Progressive Conservatives and the federal Liberal Party. The amendment was supported by 57% of delegates, but failed to receive the two-thirds majority required for it to pass.

In March 2023, at the party's Annual General Meeting in Hamilton, the new voting system passed with overwhelming support. This leadership election will mark the first time that the one member one vote system will be used in an Ontario Liberal Party leadership election.

Timeline
June 2, 2022 - Ontario general election held, resulting in a second consecutive majority PC government. The Liberals win 8 seats, falling short of official party status. Steven Del Duca, who failed to win his own seat, announces his resignation in his concession speech.
July 25, 2022 - John Fraser, who previously served as interim leader from 2018 until 2020, is unanimously selected by the Ontario Liberal caucus to serve as interim leader
August 3, 2022 - Party executive formally ratifies selection of Fraser as interim leader.
March 4-5, 2023 - Ontario Liberal Party Annual General Meeting approves a constitutional amendment changing the leadership election procedure from a delegated leadership convention to a One Member One Vote process. A new party executive is elected which will set the rules and timeline for the leadership election.

Candidates

Potential

Navdeep Bains, federal Minister of Innovation, Science and Industry (2015–2021), MP for Mississauga—Malton (2015–2021), MP for Mississauga—Brampton South (2004–2011)
Yvan Baker, MP for Etobicoke Centre (2019–present), MPP for Etobicoke Centre (2014–2018)
Maurizio Bevilacqua, Mayor of Vaughan, Ontario (2010–2022), federal Secretary of State (International Financial Institutions) (2002–2003), federal Secretary of State (Science, Research and Development) (2002), MP for Vaughan  (2004–2010), MP for Vaughan—King—Aurora (1997–2004), MP for York North (1988–1997)
Stephen Blais, MPP for Orléans (2020–present), Ottawa City Councillor (2010–2020)
Stephanie Bowman, MPP for Don Valley West (2022-present)
Michael Coteau, MP for Don Valley East (2021–present), MPP for Don Valley East (2011–2021), Minister of Community and Social Services (2018), Minister of Children and Youth Services (2016–2018), Minister of Tourism, Culture and Sport (2014–2016), Minister of Citizenship and Immigration (2013-2014), finished second in the 2020 leadership election.
Bonnie Crombie, Mayor of Mississauga, Ontario (2014–present), MP for Mississauga—Streetsville (2008–2011)
Nathaniel Erskine-Smith, MP for Beaches—East York (2015–present)
Ted Hsu, MPP for Kingston and the Islands (2022–present), MP for Kingston and the Islands (2011–2015)
Mary-Margaret McMahon, MPP for Beaches—East York (2022–present), Toronto City Councillor (2010–2018)
Yasir Naqvi, MP for Ottawa Centre (2021–present), MPP for Ottawa Centre (2007–2018), Attorney General (2016–2018), Government House Leader (2014–2018), Minister of Community Safety and Correctional Services (2014–2016), Minister of Labour (2013–2014)
Dr. Adil Shamji, MPP for Don Valley East (2022–present)
Glenn Thibeault, MPP for Sudbury (2015–2018), Minister of Energy (2016–2018), NDP MP for Sudbury (2008–2015)
Arif Virani, MP for Parkdale—High Park (2015–present)

Declined

Lucille Collard, MPP for Ottawa—Vanier (2020–present) 
Mohamad Fakih, philanthropist and founder and CEO of Paramount Fine Foods
John Fraser, Interim Leader (2018–2020, 2022–present), Parliamentary Leader (2018–present), MPP for Ottawa South (2013–present)
Mitzie Hunter, MPP for Scarborough—Guildwood (2013–present), Minister of Advanced Education and Skills Development (2018), Minister of Education (2016–2018), finished fourth in the 2020 leadership election
Jeff Lehman, CEO and Chair of Muskoka District (2022-present), three-term Mayor of Barrie, Ontario (2010–2022), 2022 Ontario general election candidate in Barrie—Springwater—Oro-Medonte, two-time of Chair of Ontario’s Big City Mayors association.
Bill Mauro, Mayor of Thunder Bay (2018–2022), MPP for  Thunder Bay—Atikokan (2003–2018), Minister of Municipal Affairs and Housing (2016–2018), Minister of Natural Resources and Forestry (2014–2016), Minister of Municipal Affairs (2014)
Mike Schreiner, leader of the Green Party of Ontario (2009–present), MPP for Guelph (2018–present)

Opinion polling

Liberal supporters

References

Ontario Liberal Party leadership elections
Future elections in Canada